James Bradley ( 1810 – after 1837) was an African slave in the United States who purchased his freedom and became an anti-slavery activist in Ohio.

Bradley was two or three years old when he was enslaved and transported to the United States, where he was purchased by a Mr. Bradley of Pendleton County, Kentucky; he subsequently moved with the Bradley family to the Arkansas Territory. While working days as a slave, Bradley began to work for himself through the night. In 1833, after eight years, he purchased his freedom and went to Cincinnati in the free state of Ohio.

Bradley associated himself with Lane Seminary and played a central role in the Lane Debates on Slavery in 1834. As the result of Bradley's moving speech, students rallied to organize educational opportunities for blacks and sought to integrate with the community. The Board of Trustees of the Seminary then shut down anti-slavery activity, which resulted in at least forty people, known as the Lane Rebels, leaving as a group. Oberlin, Ohio, was the beneficiary; it became a racially diverse community and a center for anti-slavery efforts. Bradley moved to Oberlin with the other Rebels. He studied for a year in an affiliated preparatory school of Oberlin College, the Sheffield Manual Labor Institute.

Bradley wrote an autobiographical statement that provides much of information that is known about his time of slavery and escape. Nothing is known of his life after 1837. There is no known image of or physical description of him.

Slavery

Childhood
According to Bradley, he lived in Guinea, a region of west Africa, when he was captured as a two- or three-year-old child. He later said of the experience, "the soul-destroyers tore me from my mother's arms." He was taken on a long overland journey before being put on board a ship bound for America. The ship was full of chained adult African men and women, but he was allowed free run of the deck because he was too small to be chained. He was brought to America illegally, since the legal importation of slaves ended in 1808.

After his arrival at the port of Charleston, South Carolina, he was purchased by a slaveholder, brought to Pendleton County, Kentucky and sold about six months later to a man named Bradley, from whom he took his name. He was enslaved with Mr. Bradley's family in Pendleton County. Although Bradley wrote that his owner was considered a kind master because he was not beaten and had enough to eat, Bradley stated that he was kicked and thrown around as a young child. When he was nine years old, he was hit so hard that he was knocked unconscious for a time and his owner thought he had killed him. As a fifteen-year-old, he became very sick due to overwork, which made his owner angry. In addition, the Bradley children made threatening gestures at times with knives and axes. He worked very hard, starting work at sunrise and not finishing until it was dark. From the time he was fourteen years old, he thought incessantly about how to obtain his freedom.

He taught himself to read easy words and to spell whenever he could from a spelling book that he acquired and kept in his hat. He convinced one of the owner's sons to teach him to write. His mistress found out about it on the second night of instruction. She chastised her son, telling him that if he could write, he could write a pass to help him escape. Bradley practiced on his own after that.

He moved with the Bradley family to Arkansas shortly after he turned fifteen. They lived near the Choctaw mission and Fort Towson in modern Oklahoma, which was then in the Arkansas Territory. After Mr. Bradley died, his widow had young James running her plantation.

Plan to purchase his freedom
One of the lessons that he learned as an enslaved person was to always deny any interest in desiring freedom, because he knew it would result in rough treatment. But, obtaining freedom was a strong, heart-breaking desire.

He developed a plan to buy his freedom. He worked all day, got a few hours of sleep, and then while others slept, he pursued several endeavors to make money. He started by using corn husks to weave collars for horses. He found a balance between maximizing how much time he was able to work at night and getting enough sleep that he was not too weak to work during the day. After eight years, he was able to purchase his freedom in 1833 for $700. He had another $200 to start his new life.

Freedom
Upon achieving his freedom, he headed for a free state. He visited for a time in Northern Kentucky and went to Covington, Kentucky, where he crossed the Ohio River that divided the slave states and the free states. He arrived at Cincinnati, Ohio.

Education and anti-slavery efforts

Lane Seminary
Desiring to become a minister, Bradley was admitted to Lane Seminary on May 28, 1833. The first African-American student at Lane, he said that he was not treated differently because of the color of his skin. Lyman Beecher, the president of Lane, had instructed students at the seminary to be careful in the way that they interacted with black people. There were some students who did not believe in abolition of slavery, so when Lyman Beecher invited students to his home, Bradley felt it wiser not to attend. Beecher did not understand it was not enough to model careful behavior; he thought that Bradley did not come to the event because he was timid.

While at Lane, Bradley was the institute's coordinator for rescuing slaves in their quest to be free. He helped them cross the Ohio River and make their way towards Ontario, Canada. In 1834, his testimonial was printed in The Oasis, an annual edited by Lydia Maria Child.

Lane Seminary debates

William Garrison, publisher the anti-slavery newspaper, The Liberator, published a book in 1832 that offered Thoughts on African Colonization, Or, An Impartial Exhibition of the Doctrines, Principles and Purposes of the American Colonization Society. In both, he attacks the American Colonization Society and its intended strategy to send free blacks to Africa. Garrison said the Society was "pernicious, cruel, and delusive". At the time, most white Americans believed that whites and blacks could not live together as equals. They thought that it would be better to establish colonies in Africa for former slaves and convey them to the colonies on ships. Liberia was created by those believing in colonization for repatriated slaves. On the other hand, abolitionists saw slavery as morally wrong and that slaves should be emancipated as soon as possible.

Theodore Dwight Weld, an abolitionist and former student at the Oneida Institute, near Utica, New York, led debates at Oneida in 1833. Weld arrived at Lane Seminary and became the leader of the school's student body. He helped organize a debate about slavery and trained people to deliver "spirited" speeches. The debate represented the views of the abolitionists who were against slavery and believed in emancipation against others who thought that slaves should be sent to a colony in Africa. Harriet Beecher (Stowe), the daughter of Lane's president Lyman Beecher, was among the those in attendance, according to historian Gilbert Barnes.

Bradley, who supported abolition of slavery, participated in the debates, and he was the only black person to speak. Some Southern students brought their slaves to the debates, but none of them were asked to comment. It is remarkable that not only would he speak, but people listened to him. He described what it was like to be a slave and brought his audience to tears when he described being on the slave ship. He stressed the need for equality, education, and freedom for all. Bradley's classmate, Henry B. Stanton (future husband of Elizabeth Cady Stanton), remarked that Bradley had thoroughly, intelligently, and thoughtfully addressed all the issues that are raised against immediate emancipation, such as "it would be unsafe to the community" or that "the condition of the emancipated negroes would be worse than it now is — that they are incompetent to provide for themselves — that they would become paupers and vagrants, and would rather steal than work for wages." Bradley also integrated humor in his speech. Both abolitionists and those who argued for colonization listened intently to the discussion, and a number of times the entire audience would respond with laughter. He made it clear that there was an innate desire of slaves to take care of themselves and others and what they most desired was freedom and education. Attendees found his speech to be very emotional and the most important one of the debates. The event was more like a revival than a debate, according to historian Donald M. Scott.

By the end of the speech many students were radicalized against slavery and students voted that they supported an end to slavery—immediately. The Colonization Society was voted out of existence. Some students formed an anti-slavery group, organized their efforts to establish a library, conducted Bible classes, and opened free schools in black neighborhoods. The classes became so full that potential students were turned away. At that time, one third of the state's blacks lived in Cincinnati. Bradley became a manager of the newly formed student anti-slavery society. Some of the members of the anti-slavery group went to New York to speak to the American Anti-Slavery Society about the debates and the resulting activities. Weld and the Lane Rebels integrated themselves within the black community, by renting rooms from boarding houses, attending weddings and funerals, and going to Prayer Meetings.

Local leaders and most of the trustees had Southern clients, and were concerned that their businesses would be affected as the result of the students' efforts. Many complained to Lane Seminary, while Beecher was out of town. The Board of Trustees put a stop to any anti-slavery efforts, condemned the debates, and issued a gag order against discussion of slavery. This caused many students, particularly those affiliated with Weld, to leave the school. They went to Oberlin College, making that school and town racially diverse and a center for leadership of the abolitionist movement.

Sheffield Manual Labor Institute 
Bradley went with the other Lane Rebels to Oberlin Collegiate Institute (later Oberlin College) in 1835. Sheffield had a high school level curriculum combined with manual labor. There was a plan to raise silkworms to create silk. The plan was not successful and the school closed after a year, in part because it refused to be a segregated school as required by recent Ohio legislation.

Unfortunately, nothing is known about Bradley's life after 1837. The final reference to him is in a letter that year of another Lane Rebel, C. Stewart Renshaw, who refers to him as "our dear brother". He may be the "negro, late of Sheffield College", who helped in the liberation of fourteen slaves from one plantation.

Legacy 
Bradley's speech was an example of the power of including people who are directly involved in a situation to speak to their issues and desires. It is generally people who have power—due to education, their profession, or wealth—that speak to social issues and potential solutions. Bradley showed that people who are directly involved should be part of the discourse.

The controversy surrounding the debates—due to Bradley's effectiveness as a speaker—"gave voice" to the anti-slavery movement, particularly as Weld and about 40 other Lane Rebels moved to Oberlin and the college became a leader in the abolitionist movement. Students at other colleges and universities initiated discussions about free speech at their campuses.

Statue and plaque 

A statue of Bradley was erected in 1988 by the Greater Cincinnati Bicentennial Commission in Covington, Kentucky at roughly the place that Bradley crossed the Ohio River to Cincinnati. The statue, made by George Danhires, shows Bradley sitting on a riverfront bench, facing north across the Ohio River to Cincinnati, while reading a book. It was voted one of the top five interesting statues in the greater Cincinnati area in 2014. In 2016, the statue was restored.

Media portrayal 
Bradley appears as a character in the 2019 movie Sons & Daughters of Thunder, about the Lane Debates, based on a play by Earlene Hawley and Curtis Heeter.

Notes

References

External links
 Trailer for Sons & Daughters of Thunder

Lane Rebels
Free Negroes
Oberlin College alumni
People from Cincinnati
People of pre-statehood Arkansas
American people of African descent
Guinean expatriates in the United States
African-American abolitionists
Br
Lane Theological Seminary
Literate American slaves